is a single by J-pop group Cute. From March 20, the single was sold exclusively in the Rakuten Eagles official web store, appearing later also in the Hello! Project Official Shop. It was only available for purchase during the official Hello! Project tour in 2008.

Background 
"Koero! Rakuten Eagles" was the fourth official cheer song of the professional baseball team Tohoku Rakuten Golden Eagles. In the past few years, Hello! Project had annually issued official fight songs for the team. In the 2008 season, it was Cute who were chosen to record a new song. The lively upbeat number contained a powerful message, inspiring players.

Track listing

References

External links
Koero! Rakuten Eagles at the Up-Front Works discography
Koero! Rakuten Eagles at the Hello! Project official discography

Baseball songs and chants
Fight songs
Tohoku Rakuten Golden Eagles
2008 singles
Cute (Japanese idol group) songs
Japanese-language songs
Songs written by Tsunku
Song recordings produced by Tsunku
Zetima Records singles
2008 songs